Allira Toby is an Australian soccer player, who currently plays for Canberra United in the W-League.

Club career

Junior football
Toby grew up in Ipswich, Queensland and began her junior career with Ipswich City Bulls. At 16 she joined Annerley FC followed by Olympic FC.

Adelaide United
Toby was recruited to Adelaide United in the W-League for the 2015–16 season. She subsequently moved back to Queensland to play with the Roar.

Brisbane Roar
Toby would go on to win Roar's Golden Boot award with 5 goals in their W-League Premiership winning campaign in 2017/18. She would win the club's Golden Boot award again in the following season after another 5 goal haul.

Moreton Bay United

Famalicão
In October 2020, Toby was offered a one-year contract by Portuguese club Famalicão. She flew over and was involved in a pre-season friendly in Spain. A few weeks later the club contacted her to tell her they terminated her contract.

Sydney FC
In December 2020, Toby returned to Australia, joining Sydney FC.

Canberra United
In September 2021, Toby joined Canberra United.

Personal life
Toby is Aboriginal Australian, and works as a counsellor assisting Aboriginal and Torres Strait Islander school students.

References 

Living people
1994 births
Sportspeople from Ipswich, Queensland
Soccer players from Queensland
Women's association football forwards
Adelaide United FC (A-League Women) players
Brisbane Roar FC (A-League Women) players
Sydney FC (A-League Women) players
Canberra United FC players
Australian women's soccer players
Indigenous Australian soccer players
F.C. Famalicão (women) players